Miles Koules (born June 25, 1994) is an American professional ice hockey winger who is currently an unrestricted free agent. He most recently played for the Binghamton Devils of the American Hockey League (AHL). He previously played for HIFK in the Finnish top tier league Liiga.

Internationally, he has represented the United States at the World U-17 Hockey Challenge.

Playing career

Amateur 
Koules was born in  Los Angeles, California to parents Risa Shapiro and Oren Koules. Growing up in California, he stated that he felt there were limited opportunities to develop as an ice hockey player. After his father became a part owner of the Tampa Bay Lightning, Koules enrolled at Shattuck-Saint Mary's in Minnesota to further his development. After completing three seasons at Shattuck-Saint Mary's, Koules joined the USA Hockey National Team Development Program (USNTDP). At the age of 16, Koules verbally committed to play collegiate hockey for the University of North Dakota.

On January 10, 2012, Koules' Western Hockey League (WHL) rights were traded to the Medicine Hat Tigers in exchange for Reid Petryk. On April 30, 2012, Koules committed to leave the USNTDP and join the Tigers for the 2012–13 season, thus foregoing his collegiate eligibility. The Tigers general manager Brad McEwen credited this change to Koules' personal connections to members on the team, such as Emerson Etem and Hunter Shinkaruk.

He stayed with the Medicine Hat Tigers for nearly three seasons, recording career highs in his second season with the team and accepting invitations to NHL Development camps. On September 29, 2014, Koules was traded to the Portland Winterhawks in exchange for a 2017 4th round draft pick.

Professional

After his major junior hockey career concluded following the 2014–15 season, Koules joined the Quad City Mallards of the ECHL. He was later traded to the Wichita Thunder in exchange for future considerations after playing in 44 games for the Mallards.

On October 15, 2016, Koules was traded to the Atlanta Gladiators. His playing rights were later traded to the Tulsa Oilers. He was again traded on January 24, 2017, to the Elmira Jackals but it was short-lived as his playing rights were moved to the Indy Fuel days later.

On February 2, 2017, Koules was signed to a professional tryout agreement with the Ontario Reign of the American Hockey League (AHL). After playing in two games for the Reign, he was returned to the ECHL before signing a 25-game professional tryout with the Cleveland Monsters of the AHL in March 2017. His contract evolved into an AHL contract for the 2017–18 season on July 26, 2017. After attending the Columbus Blue Jackets NHL training camp on a tryout contract, Koules was reassigned to the AHL for the 2017–18 season.

After spending the entire 2017–18 season in the AHL, Koules joined the HIFK in the Finnish top tier league Liiga during the 2018-19 season. He returned to North America after agreeing to an AHL contract with the Monsters on January 11, 2019 after playing in 13 games. He scored his first two goals of the season in a 6–3 loss to the Syracuse Crunch on February 2.

After a one-year stint with the Bakersfield Condors in the COVID-19 affected 2019–20 season, Koules extended his career in the AHL, joining the Binghamton Devils on a professional tryout contract prior to the pandemic delayed 2020–21 season on February 1, 2021.

International play
While playing at St. Mary's, Koules was named to the U.S. Under-17 Select Team to compete in the 2010 Five Nations tournament. Koules scored his first goal of the tournament on August 18, 2010, in a 5–3 win over Team Czech Republic.

He helped lead Team USA to the 2010 Under-17 Four Nations Cup with seven points in four games.

He won a silver medal with Team USA at the 2011 World U-17 Hockey Challenge.

Personal life
Koules is the son of talent agent Risa Shapiro and entrepreneur Oren Koules. Koules and Shapiro separated in 2005 and eventually divorced in 2007. Oren remarried in 2008 and as a result, Miles has two younger half sisters.

His father Oren Koules was the franchise owner of the Tampa Bay Lightning from 2008–2010 and served as a producer on "Two and a Half Men" and the Saw horror franchise.

Career statistics

References

External links

1994 births
Living people
American men's ice hockey right wingers
Atlanta Gladiators players
Bakersfield Condors players
Binghamton Devils players
Cleveland Monsters players
HIFK players
Ice hockey people from Los Angeles
Medicine Hat Tigers players
Ontario Reign (AHL) players
Portland Winterhawks players
Quad City Mallards (ECHL) players
Tulsa Oilers (1992–present) players
USA Hockey National Team Development Program players
Wichita Thunder players